Nutgrove is a rural locality in the Toowoomba Region, Queensland, Australia. In the  Nutgrove had a population of 32 people.

History 
The Cooyar railway line opened to Nutgrove on 28 April 1913 with the locality served by the Nutgrove railway station, located immediately to the north of Douglas Nutgrove Road, now in Wutul.

Nutgrove State School opened on 20 June 1923 and closed on 1947. It was located at 5779 Dalby Cooyar Road.

In the  Nutgrove had a population of 32 people.

Road infrastructure
The Oakey–Cooyar Road runs through from south to north-east. The Dalby–Cooyar Road enters from the west and joins Oakey–Cooyar Road.

Heritage listings 
Nutgrove has a number of heritage-listed sites, including:
 Narko-Nutgrove Road from Highgrove to Nutgrove: Muntapa Tunnel

Economy 
There are a number of homesteads in the locality:

 Bowriver
 Highgrove

Education 
There are no schools in Nutgrove. The nearest primary school is Cooyar State School in Cooyar to the north-east. The nearest secondary school is Quinalow State School (offering schooling up to Year 10) in Quinalow to the south-west with the more distant Oakey State High School in Oakey to the south offering schooling up to Year 12.

References 

Toowoomba Region
Localities in Queensland